Lu(u)nda or Ruund may refer to:

Places 
 Lunda (Asia Minor), an Ancient Roman city and present Catholic titular see
 Lunda, Färingsö parish, a locality in Ekerö Municipality, Stockholm County, Sweden
 Lunda, Ohio, an unincorporated community in Liberty Township, Union County, Ohio, United States
 Lunda Sharif, a town in Dera Ismail Khan District, Khyber Pakhtunkhwa, Pakistan

Africa 
 Kingdom of Lunda, a pre-colonial African confederation of states in what is now the Democratic Republic of Congo, Angola and Zambia
 Lunda Norte Province, Angola
 Lunda Sul Province, Angola
 Kasongo Lunda, a town in Kwango District, Bandundu Province, the Democratic Republic of the Congo
 Mission sui iuris of Lunda, a Roman Catholic mission sui iuris (primary pre-diocesan missionary jurisdiction) in Angola from 1900 to 1940

Ethnography 
 Lunda people, a group living in the Democratic Republic of Congo, Angola and Zambia
 Eastern Lunda, a group living in the Democratic Republic of Congo and Zambia
 Kanongesha-Lunda people or Western Lunda, a group living mainly in the North-Western Province of Zambia
 Lunda languages, a family of Bantu languages
 Lunda language, spoken in the Democratic Republic of Congo, Angola, and Zambia
 Ruund language or Northern Lunda language, spoken in the Democratic Republic of the Congo and Angola
 Salampasu language, spoken in the Democratic Republic of Congo

Other uses 
 Elena Lunda (1901–1947), Italian actress
 Lunda, a proposed bird genus including the tufted puffin
 Lunda rope squirrel, a species of rodent found in the Democratic Republic of the Congo and Angola